Renzi is an Italian surname. Notable people with the surname include:

Andrea Renzi (actor) (born 1963), Italian actor
Andrea Renzi (basketball) (born 1989), Italian professional basketball player
Anna Renzi (c.1620–after 1660), Italian opera singer
Carli Renzi (born 1982), Australian judo competitor and wrestler
Clement Renzi (1925–2009), American sculptor
Eva Renzi (1944–2005), German actress
Grace Renzi (1922–2011), American painter
Lorenzo Renzi (born 1939), Italian linguist and philologist
Maggie Renzi (born 1951), American film producer and actress
Matteo Renzi (born 1975), 56th Prime Minister of Italy
Mike Renzi, American composer, music director, pianist and jazz musician
Nicola Renzi (born 1979), Sammarinese politician 
Pina Renzi (1901–1984), Italian film actress
Renzo Renzi (born 1956), Sammarinese politician
Rick Renzi (born 1958), American politician

Fictional characters
Carlo Renzi, a character in The Sopranos TV series

Italian-language surnames